Group A of the 1997 Fed Cup Asia/Oceania Zone Group II was one of two pools in the Asia/Oceania Zone Group II of the 1997 Fed Cup. Four teams competed in a round robin competition, with the top two teams and the bottom two teams proceeding to their respective sections of the play-offs.

Uzbekistan vs. Malaysia

Singapore vs. Sri Lanka

Malaysia vs. Singapore

Uzbekistan vs. Sri Lanka

Uzbekistan vs. Singapore

Malaysia vs. Sri Lanka

See also
Fed Cup structure

References

External links
 Fed Cup website

1997 Fed Cup Asia/Oceania Zone